Rodney Edward Laporte  (born 24 October 1953 in Moose Jaw, Saskatchewan)  is a Saskatchewan lawyer and a former Canadian Member of Parliament (MP). Before becoming a politician, Laporte had been a student of history and Law at the University of Regina.

Laporte became the New Democratic Party (NDP) MP for Moose Jaw—Lake Centre in the 1988 federal election, winning a riding that had been a Progressive Conservative (PC) stronghold for thirty years. It was a very narrow win, garnering only 408 votes more than PC Candidate Bill Gottselig. In the 1993 election, he lost the seat to Reform Party candidate Allan Kerpan. His loss was even narrower that his initial win: only 310 votes separated him from the winner.

During the 2002–2003 NDP leadership race, Laporte endorsed Bill Blaikie. Laporte now practises law for the Saskatchewan Legal Aid Commission in Meadow Lake, Saskatchewan He is also the President of Canadian Union of Public Employees Local 1949.

References

External links
 

1953 births
Living people
Members of the House of Commons of Canada from Saskatchewan
New Democratic Party MPs
People from Moose Jaw